Matukpur is a village in Barhara block of Bhojpur district in Bihar, India. As of 2011, its population was 2,724, in 404 households.

References 

Villages in Bhojpur district, India